The Artaxiad dynasty or Ardaxiad dynasty (Artashesian dynasty) ruled the Kingdom of Armenia from 189 BC until their overthrow by the Romans in AD 12. Their realm included Greater Armenia, Sophene and intermittently Lesser Armenia and parts of Mesopotamia. Their main enemies were the Romans, the Seleucids and the Parthians, against whom the Armenians conducted multiple wars.

Historical background

According to the geographer Strabo, Artaxias  and Zariadres were two satraps of the Seleucid Empire, who ruled over the provinces of Greater Armenia and Sophene respectively. After the Seleucid defeat at the Battle of Magnesia in 190 BC, a coup by the Armenian noble family of Artashes toppled the Yervanduni dynasty and declared their independence, with Artaxias becoming the first king of the Artaxiad dynasty of Armenia in 188 BC.

Scholars believe that Artaxias and Zariadres were not foreign generals but local figures related to the previous Orontid dynasty, as their Irano-Armenian (and not Greek) names would indicate. According to Nina Garsoïan / Encyclopaedia Iranica, the Artaxiads were a branch of the earlier Orontid (Eruandid) dynasty of Iranian origin attested as ruling in Armenia from at least the 5th century BC.

Consolidation of Armenian lands under Artaxias
Artaxias is regarded as one of the most important kings in Armenian history. He presented himself as a legitimate descendant of Orontids, although it is unknown if he was in fact related to that dynasty. In the beginning of his rule, parts of the Armenian Highlands with Armenian speaking populations remained under the rule of neighbouring states. Artaxias made the reunification of those lands under his domain a priority. Greek geographer and historian Strabo recounts the conquests of Artaxias towards West, East, North and South as well as stating that the population of those territories was Armenian speaking.
Strabo, Geography, book 11, chapter 14:
"According to report, Armenia, though a small country in earlier times, was enlarged by Artaxias and Zariadris, who formerly were generals of Antiochus the Great, but later, after his defeat, reigned as kings (the former as king of Sophene, Acisene, Odomantis, and certain other countries, and the latter as king of the country round Artaxata), and jointly enlarged their kingdoms by cutting off for themselves parts of the surrounding nations,--I mean by cutting off Caspiane and Phaunitis and Basoropeda from the country of the Medes; and the country along the side of Mt. Paryadres and Chorsene and Gogarene, which last is on the far side of the Cyrus River, from that of the Iberians; and Carenitis and Xerxene, which border on Lesser Armenia or else are parts of it, from that of the Chalybians and the Mosynoeci; and Acilisene and the country round the Antitaurus from that of the Cataonians; and Taronitis from that of the Syrians; and therefore they all speak the same language."

According to Strabo and Plutarch, Artaxias also founded the Armenian capital Artaxata with the aid of the Carthaginian general Hannibal who was being sheltered from the Romans within Artaxias' court. The population of the previous Orontid capital of Ervandashat was transferred to Artaxata. Over a dozen stone boundary markers have been discovered on the territory of modern Armenia from the time of the reign of Artaxias with Aramaic inscriptions; before their discovery, the existence of these stones was attested by Moses of Khorene. In these inscriptions Artaxias claims descent from the Orontid dynasty: King Artaxias, the son of Orontid Zariadres.

Hellenistic influences
Though Greater Armenia had only been superficially affected by the conquests of Alexander the Great, the country began to be influenced by the Hellenistic world under the Orontids in the 3rd century and this process reached its peak under the Artaxiads, particularly King Tigranes the Great. During this time, the Armenian rulers incorporated many Greek elements. This is shown by the contemporary Armenian coins (which had first appeared under the Orontids). They followed Greek models and have inscriptions in the Greek language. Some coins describe the Armenian kings as "Philhellenes" ("lovers of Greek culture"). Knowledge of Greek in Armenia is also evidenced by surviving parchments and rock inscriptions. Cleopatra, the wife of Tigranes the Great, invited Greeks such as the rhetor Amphicrates and the historian Metrodorus of Scepsis to the Armenian court, and - according to Plutarch - when the Roman general Lucullus seized the Armenian capital Tigranocerta, he found a troupe of Greek actors who had arrived to perform plays for Tigranes. Tigranes' successor Artavasdes II even composed Greek tragedies himself. Nevertheless, Armenian culture still retained a strong Iranian element, particularly in religious matters.

Art & architecture
Artaxias built boundary stones(stelae), reminiscent of Achaemenid models, around Lake Sevan to demarcate land-holdings. The boundary stones, covered in Aramaic script as a claim to royal power, indicate an Achaemenid crown and his "neo-Persian" kingship.

The stelae emphasize the Achaemenid dynastic roots of Artaxias' name. Some words such as "QTRbr", which could reflect the Middle Persian *tāgabar, "diadem-bearer", "king", comparatively appears in Old Armenian for "king" (t'agavorin) indicating the Persian origins of Armenian royal culture.

Religion
As Prof. James R. Russell states; "It was only natural that the Artaxiad monarchs should declare themselves philhellenes, yet it must not be thought that their religious beliefs ceased to be what they had been of old: staunchly Zoroastrian." Prof. David Marshall Lang adds that the Hellenistic religion and the pantheon of the Classical divinities had undoubtedly become popular amongst the upper classes in the later Artaxiad period.

Armenian Empire

During the reign of Tigranes the Great (95–55 BC), the kingdom of Armenia was at the zenith of its power and briefly became the most powerful state to the Roman east. Artaxias and his followers had already constructed the base upon which Tigranes built his empire. Despite this fact, the territory of Armenia, being a mountainous one, was governed by nakharars who were largely autonomous from the central authority. Tigranes unified them in order to create internal security in the kingdom. The borders of Armenia stretched from the Caspian Sea to the Mediterranean Sea. At that time, the Armenians had become so expansive, that the Romans and Parthians had to join forces in order to beat them. Tigranes found a more central capital within his domain and named it Tigranocerta.

Large territories were taken from Parthians, who were forced to sign a treaty of friendship with Tigranes. Iberia, Albania, and Atropatene also lost territories and the remainder of their Kingdoms became vassal states. The Greeks within the Seleucid Empire offered Tigranes the Seleucid crown in 83 BC, after which the Armenian empire reached as far south as modern Acre, Israel resulting in a conflict with Hasmoneans.

Decline
Roman involvement in Asia Minor brought Tigranes' empire to an end. Tigranes had allied himself with Rome's great enemy Mithridates the Great, King of Pontus, and during the Third Mithridatic War, in 69 BC, a Roman army led by Lucullus invaded the Armenian empire and routed Tigranes outside Tigranocerta. In 66 BC, Lucullus' successor Pompey finally forced Tigranes to surrender. Pompey reduced Armenia to its former borders but allowed Tigranes to retain the throne as an ally of Rome. From now on, Armenia would become a buffer state between the two competing empires of the Romans and the Parthians.

Tigranes' heir Artavasdes II maintained the alliance with Rome, giving helpful advice to the Roman general Marcus Licinius Crassus on his campaign against the Parthians – advice which went unheeded and led to Crassus' disastrous defeat at the Battle of Carrhae. When Mark Antony became ruler of Rome's eastern provinces, he began to suspect the loyalty of Artavasdes, who had married his sister to the heir to the Parthian throne. In 35 BC, Antony invaded Armenia and sent Artavasdes into captivity in Egypt, where he was later executed. Antony installed his own six-year-old son by Cleopatra, Alexander Helios, on the throne of Armenia. Artavasdes' son Artaxias II gained help from the Parthians, seized the throne back and massacred the Roman garrisons in Armenia, but after a reign of ten years he was murdered. The kingdom broke down into a civil war between pro-Roman and pro-Parthian parties until it decisively became a Roman protectorate under the emperor Augustus. The Artaxiad dynasty petered out in chaos and it was a considerable time before the Arsacid dynasty emerged as their undisputed successors.

Artaxiad Kings of Armenia
(Note: Some dates are approximate or doubtful).

 Artaxias I (190–159 BC)
 Tigranes I (159–123 BC)
 Artavasdes I (123–95 BC)
 Tigranes the Great (Tigranes II, 95–55 BC)
 Artavasdes II (55–34 BC)
 Artaxias II (33–20 BC)
 Tigranes III (20–10 BC)
 Tigranes IV with Erato (10–2 BC)
 Ariobarzanes (2 BC–4 AD)
 Artavasdes III (4–6 AD)
 Tigranes V then ruled with Erato (6–12 AD)

Genealogy of the Artaxiads

See also 
 Artaxiad dynasty of Iberia

Notes

Bibliography

Primary sources
Lucius Ampelius, Liber Memoralis
Appian, Roman History, "Syrian War" and "Mithridatic War"
Cassius Dio, Roman History
Faustus of Byzantium, History of the Armenians
Movses Khorenatsi, History of the Armenians
Plutarch, Parallel Lives, "Antoninus Pius", "Crassus" and "Lucullus"
Strabo, Geography
Tacitus, Annals

Secondary sources
 
 
 
 

 
189 BC
180s BC establishments
Armenian kingdoms